Colin Beck may refer to:

 Colin Beck (diplomat) (born 1964), Solomon Islands diplomat
 Colin Beck (rugby union) (born 1959), South African rugby union player